Anthony More may refer to:

 Antonis Mor (  1517–  1577), Dutch portrait painter
 Anthony Moore (born 1948), British musician